is the fourth solo studio album by Japanese hip hop producer DJ Krush. It was released in 1996. It peaked at number 100 on the UK Albums Chart.

Critical reception

Ned Raggett of AllMusic gave the album 4 stars out of 5, calling it "a fairly good effort, as always with Krush's brand of jazz-tinged, heavy, druggy breakbeats and scratches at the center of things."

Track listing

Charts

References

External links
 

1996 albums
DJ Krush albums
Mo' Wax albums